Settle The Score is an EP released by San Diego-based pop-punk band Fight Fair. The EP was released on November 18, 2008. It was available for pre-order on both SmartPunk and InterPunk. It also became influential work for future easycore artists.

Track listing

Personnel 

Alex Bigman - Lead Vocals
Joshua Reef - Drums, Percussion
Evan "DJ Blap" Henkel - Guitar, Backing Vocals
Chris Begley - Bass, Backing Vocals
Kyle Wanninger - Guitar
Nathan Whittle  - Additional Instruments

References 

SmartPunk: Settle The Score
InterPunk: Settle The Score

External links
 Fight Fair's profile at MySpace
 Fight Fair's profile at PureVolume
 Fight Fair's profile at Buzznet
 Fight Fair's profile at YouTube

2008 EPs
Triple Crown Records EPs